Juliana Knust Sampaio (born May 29, 1981, in Niterói, Rio de Janeiro) is a Brazilian actress.

Knust began her career in the 1997 season of Malhação. But it was in 2003, starring alongside Malu Mader in the soap opera Celebridade, where she played Sandra, that her career was consolidated. After that, she appeared on the cover of several magazines such as Fitness and VIP, and posed nude for the cover of the Brazilian edition of Playboy on December 13, 2007.

Career 
Knust began studying theater age 12. She enrolled in a vocational school for the performing arts, taking courses in video and stage and, after making some contacts and some tests, she was given a place in the Actors Workshop of the Globe.

Knust began her career at 15 when she presented an educational program with Regina Case. Her acting debut was interpreting the part of the fat Laura in Rede Globo's teen soap, Malhação. After that, she appeared in Bambuluá, Sandy & Junior, Sítio do Picapau Amarelo and an episode of Carga Pesada, receiving an invitation to play Sandra in Celebridade in 2003.

Since then, she has appeared in soap operas and shows like A Diarista, América and Cobras & Lagartos. Soon after starting his TV work, Juliana began to discover also the theatrical universe. Participated in the plays "Pequena Sereia", "Pocahontas", "Pai, Qual é a tua?" e "Tudo de Bom".

Knust appeared in the short film Vila Isabel, alongside Paulo Goulart and Nicette Bruno. She also worked in Achados e Perdidos (2005) and Xuxa e o Tesouro da Cidade Perdida (2004).

In 2007, she had a part in TV dram Duas Caras and in the theater with the play Alarme Falso.

In 2008, she appeared in the series Casos e Acasos and Faça Sua História.

In 2009, she was in the theater with the play Vergonha dos Pés, alongside actor Danton Mello. And he made a cameo in  "A Turma do Didi".

In 2010, she was in the series A Vida Alheia written by Miguel Falabella. The following year, Knust was in a series of episodes of Macho Man. Between 2011 and 2012, plays the part of Zuleika in the soap Fina Estampa.

In 2013, returns to television for a cameo on the soap opera side Lado a Lado. Is beside the actor Eri Johnson stars in the play Pequeno Dicionário Amoroso. Currently stars in the series Uma Rua Sem Vergonha in Multishow, in which she plays a call girl Marlene. 
In 2015 she returns to TV in the 23rd season of Malhação, as an advisor Bia.

In 2017, he signs with RecordTV and integrates the cast of the first phase of the novel Belaventura playing the queen Vitoriana and then stars in a novel Apocalipse alongside Igor Rickli and Sérgio Marone.

Personal life 
Knust married the designer Gustavo Machado on September 8, 2009. She has a son, Mateus. On February 27, 2015 the couple's second child, Arthur, was born.

Filmography

Television

Film

Internet

Theater

References

External links 

1981 births
Living people
People from Niterói
Brazilian people of Swiss-German descent
Brazilian telenovela actresses
Brazilian film actresses
Brazilian stage actresses